"Todo Cambió " is a song by Mexican-American singer Becky G. It was released on March 3, 2017 by Kemosabe Records and RCA Records as the intended third single from her then forthcoming Spanish debut album. Gomez released two remixes: the first featuring boy band CNCO and the second with Justin Quiles. The song was later scrapped along with two other singles from the record, while her debut Spanish album was released in 2019.

Background
Gomez began rumors of marriage to her boyfriend, Sebastian Lletget, after posting photos of herself wearing a wedding dress on social media. She later clarified that it was all part of the music video for the single. Gomez has stated that the song came to her while her life was "going through a lovely turnaround".

Music video
The music video, directed by Daniel Duran, was filmed in Madrid, Spain. It was uploaded on Gomez's VEVO account on March 2. As of November 2019, the visual has over 74 million views.

The video sees Gomez walking dogs and collides with a man walking his own. They end up talking and began dating. Later on, another man, possibly her boyfriend, proposes to Gomez and she agrees. While getting ready for the wedding, Gomez starts doubting the relationship. As she is walking down the aisle, Gomez's dogs bark and she stops, thinking about the other man she met. After realizing she loves him, Gomez decides to run and chase her true love.

Track listing

Charts

Certifications

References

2017 singles
2016 songs
Becky G songs
Kemosabe Records singles
Music videos shot in Spain
Songs written by Becky G
Songs written by LunchMoney Lewis
Songs written by Billboard (record producer)